R706 road may refer to:
 R706 road (Ireland)
 R706 (South Africa)